The São Tomé paradise flycatcher (Terpsiphone atrochalybeia), also known as São Tomé flycatcher, is a species of bird in the family Monarchidae. The species was described by Thomas Richard Heywood Thomson in 1842, with Tchitrea atrochalybeia the binomial and Fernando Po given as the type locality. The species is endemic to São Tomé Island.
Its natural habitats are subtropical or tropical dry forests and subtropical or tropical moist lowland forests.

References

Terpsiphone
Endemic birds of São Tomé and Príncipe
Endemic fauna of São Tomé Island
Birds described in 1842
Taxonomy articles created by Polbot